Marcelo Muñoz is an Argentine professional football manager.

Career
Since January until June 2004 and January until February 2008 he coached the Aruba national football team.

9 July 2012 he died after battling cancer.

References

External links

Year of birth missing
2012 deaths
Argentine football managers
Expatriate football managers in Aruba
Aruba national football team managers
Place of birth missing